Mats Arehn is a Swedish film director and screenwriter. At the 16th Guldbagge Awards he won the award for Best Film for To Be a Millionaire.

Selected filmography
 Maria (1975)
 The Assignment (1977)
 Father to Be (1979)
 To Be a Millionaire (1980)
 Istanbul (1989)
 The Chef (2005)
 Oskar, Oskar (2009)

References

External links
 
 

1946 births
Living people
Swedish film directors
Swedish screenwriters
Swedish male screenwriters
Writers from Stockholm